Metacrisia courregesi is a moth of the family Erebidae first described by Paul Dognin in 1891. It is found in Ecuador.

References

Phaegopterina
Moths described in 1891